Detour is a 2013 film directed by William Dickerson.

Plot
Jackson Alder awakes to find he has been buried alive inside his Jeep after being hit by a mudslide. He tries to open his window to see how high the mudslide is, but soil starts pouring into his car, so he quickly rolls up the window. 

Soon after, his sunroof starts caving in, but he manages to stop it from collapsing by using tape and a tire lock. He drinks his remaining water and regrets it instantly as it was all the water he had left. He draws a cross on the back of a seat and starts praying.

Later, when water starts dripping through the cracks of the sunroof, Jackson makes a funnel out of one of his credit cards and props the empty water bottle below where the water is dripping from. He takes apart a camping chair and attempts to slide the pole through a small hole in the sunroof, but it doesn't work, so he scrunches up a newspaper to cover the hole.

Roping twine through the pole with a bottle cap, he attempts to force it through the sunroof, in order to measure how deep he is beneath the surface. The pole pushes through the mud, and after a lot of difficulty, he succeeds in pushing through the surface. This lets him calculate that he is only 3 meters from the surface. 

He attempts to create smoke so rescuers can find him, so he scrunches up some paper and sets it alight. The fire burns out of control after he accidentally drops it but he manages to extinguish the fire. The car shakes suddenly and mud starts filling the pole causing him to hit his head on the pole and pass out.

When he wakes up, he discovers his car now partially covered in mud and a wound to his head. He improvises a bandage out of his button shirt and wraps it around his head, securing it with his belt.

He attempts to stop the mud from filling the car further. Finally gathering up the courage to climb through the mud, he strips down to his underwear and rubs motor oil all over his body to make the escape easier. With the spare tire on his body for air, he manages to escape through the sunroof and dig through the soil to freedom. The films ends as Jackson climbs to the surface, with a view of the city in the background.

Cast
Neil Hopkins as Jackson

Brea Grant  as Laurie

Ptolemy Slocum as Preston

References

External links

2013 films
2013 thriller drama films
One-character films
2013 independent films
2010s survival films
2013 drama films